Big Island Lake Cree Territory is an Indian reserve of the Big Island Lake Cree Nation in Saskatchewan. It is 39 kilometres east of Cold Lake, Alberta. In the 2016 Canadian Census, it recorded a population of 808 living in 132 of its 165 total private dwellings. In the same year, its Community Well-Being index was calculated at 37 of 100, compared to 58.4 for the average First Nations community and 77.5 for the average non-Indigenous community.

References

Indian reserves in Saskatchewan